Aït Hamadouche or Beni Hamadouche is a village in the Boumerdès Province in Kabylie, Algeria.

Location
The village is surrounded by Isser River and Meraldene River and the towns of Souk El-Had, Thénia / Tizi-Nait-Aicha  and Beni Amrane in the Khachna mountain range.

Notable people

Gallery

References

Villages in Algeria
Boumerdès Province
Kabylie